Jack Welpott (April 27, 1923 – November 24, 2007) was an American photographer.

Biography 

He was born in Kansas City on April 27, 1923, grew up in southern Indiana, and was educated at primary and secondary schools in Missouri, Illinois and Indiana. He served in World War II, and returned to the Hoosier state to attend Indiana University. In 1949, he earned his BS in Economics from the Indiana University, Bloomington. Unsure of his direction, he enrolled in a photography class and met the legendary photography instructor Henry Holmes Smith. Under his tutelage, Welpott became enthralled with black-and-white photography as a fine art form.

He studied painting under Leon Golub and Harry Engle, and design with George Rickey, receiving   his MS in Visual Communication in 1955, followed by an  MFA in 1959.

Career 

He  began his long teaching career at San Francisco State College as he pursued the career of a professional photographer. In 1973 he was the recipient of the Medal of Arles, France; later that same year he received a grant from the National Endowment for the Arts; and, in 1983, a Polaroid grant in association with the Museum of Photographic Arts, San Diego.

Works 

Welpott's  photographs are in the collections of the Museum of Modern Art, New York; Whitney Museum, New York; International Museum of Photography, George Eastman House, Rochester, New York; Art Institute of Chicago; Center of Creative Photography, University of Arizona, Tucson; University of New Mexico, Albuquerque; Norton Simon Art Museum, Pasadena, California; Oakland Museum of Modern Art, California; San Francisco Museum of Modern Art, Bibliothèque Nationale, Paris, and the Muscarelle Museum of Art, Williamsburg, Virginia.

He died of kidney failure on November 24, 2007, at the age of 84.

Bibliography 

   
 Welpott, Jack. Jack Welpott, Vintage Photographs 1952-1972: Exhibition [Catalog], Jan 23 – March 20, 1999. Petaluma, CA: Barry Singer Gallery, 1999.
 Welpott, Jack. Jack Welpott: The Halide Conversion. Tokyo, Japan: Gallery Min, 1988 
 Camerawork Gallery, Jack Welpott, Leland Rice, and Harold Jones. Contemporary California Photography: Catalogue of the Exhibition Camerawork Gallery, March, April, May 1978. San Francisco: San Francisco Camerawork Press, 1978.
 Welpott, Jack. The Visual Dialogue Foundation [Exhibition] at the Friends of Photography Gallery, Carmel, Calif., Febr. 4 Through March 10, 1972: [Catalog.]. 1972. OCLC 63353376

References 

Pedro Meyer
Ben Nixon

Further reading
 
 
  
 
 
 
 
 
 
 
 
 
 
 
 
 
 
 
 

1923 births
2007 deaths
20th-century American photographers
People from Kansas City, Kansas
Deaths from kidney failure
Indiana University alumni
American military personnel of World War II